Marry Me is the soundtrack album to the 2022 film of the same name, performed by its stars Jennifer Lopez and Maluma. It was released on February 4, 2022, by Universal Studios and Sony Music Latin, marking Lopez's first full-length release since A.K.A. (2014) and Maluma's first since Papi Juancho (2020).

The soundtrack album was nominated at the 13th Hollywood Music in Media Awards under the Soundtrack Album category. The Marry Me Live Concert Special was also nominated under the LIVE CONCERT FOR VISUAL MEDIA category.

Background and development
While promoting her single "Medicine" in April 2019, Lopez told Ebro Darden of Beats 1 radio that the next album she releases will "probably be with a new movie". Later that same month, it was announced that she would be starring alongside Owen Wilson in the romantic comedy, Marry Me (2022). In July 2019, Colombian singer Maluma was cast to play Lopez's fiancé in the film. During their first week of shooting, on October 5, 2019, Lopez and Maluma performed her song "No Me Ames" during his show at Madison Square Garden in New York City. In February 2020, Lopez announced that she would be releasing a new album alongside Marry Me that would also serve as the film's soundtrack. She told Jimmy Fallon during an interview that the album would feature "six or eight" songs performed by herself and "two or three" songs performed by Maluma, as well as a duet between the two that is performed as both an uptempo and a ballad.

Writing and recording
After receiving the script for Marry Me, Lopez and her team started finding places in the film where they could place music. According to the singer, "you can't have a movie about two pop stars who are performing and not have a soundtrack". While on the It's My Party tour during the summer of 2019, she listened to 100 songs submitted by different writers and producers and narrowed it down to "seven or eight" songs to be featured in the film. The process of creating the soundtrack was "really difficult" for Lopez due to the fact that she wasn't making a "J.Lo album" and was instead "writing songs for the story", noting that she was on tour during the writing and recording process.

After signing onto the project, Maluma started writing songs with his long-time producer Edgar Barrera. The first song they wrote was "Segundo", which was met with positive reception from the studio and director. The "R&B-tinged pop" song features an "earworm finger-snapping beat", and lyrics where Maluma asks their lover for a second chance After being asked to do "another, more commercial reggaeton song", Maluma and Barrera wrote a second song called "Uno en un Millón". "Uno en un Millón" ("1 in a Million") fuses "raggeaton drums with pop beats." In similar vein, "Pa Ti (For You)" is another downtempo reggaeton song. Later on "Church" Lopez creates a "non-typical church song" which would "get the party started". Billboard staff called the song "gospel-infused pop". Other songs include "Love of My Life" which centres on finding love from oneself first and features some acapella vocals by Lopez, and the acoustic guitar-driven song "After Love (Part 1)". On the latter, Lopez sings about failed relationships but the inclusion of EDM beats makes you "dance your sorrows away" according to Billboard staff.

Critical reception

According to Tomas Mier of Rolling Stone, "Jennifer Lopez and Maluma Have Real Musical Chemistry on the ‘Marry Me’ Soundtrack". He also added "Though lyrically shallow, and unsurprisingly so, the LP aids Marry Me’s storyline with its themes of longing, love-building, and deception. Maluma doesn’t take many risks, but he still delivers when he sticks to his known reggaeton tricks. For her part, Lopez owns the album’s ballads and bops — flashing her musical prowess and versatility at every turn." Holly Alvarado of Remezcla said that "Throughout the 13 tracks, its entirety is about the rigid ideals of finding love. And even if we hate to admit it, everything in life is guiding us to it, being the film’s core theme." She also added that "Each song is a hit. Even though the record is only 37 minutes short, it’s loaded with tender melodies that make the film a uniquely produced rom-com for the year."

Singles
On September 21, 2020, Lopez and Maluma posted a 15-second teaser on both of their respective social media accounts to announce that they would be releasing a "two-song" collaboration, called "Pa' Ti + Lonely", on September 24, 2020. While both songs were originally announced to be featured on the Marry Me soundtrack, "Lonely" did not end up making the final cut. "Pa' Ti" marked Lopez's highest chart debut in the United States since 2017, debuting at number nine on Billboard's Hot Latin Songs for the chart dated October 10, 2020. It became Lopez's highest entry on the chart since her feature on "Adrenalina" (2014), as well as her seventh top-ten song and Maluma's 13th. "On My Way", the second single from the album, was released on November 18, 2021, alongside the trailer for the film. "Marry Me", the title track, was released as the third and final single. Two versions of the song were released - a ballad version and an uptempo version denoted as "Kat & Bastian Duet".

Track listing

Credits and personnel

Personnel

 Steve Mackey – Vocal production (all tracks)
 Trevor Muzzy – Vocal production (all tracks)
 Edgar Barrera – Production (3, 5, 9)
 The Monsters & Strangerz – Production (2, 12)
 M-Phazes – Production (7, 14)
 Keith Hetrick – Production (10, 13)
 Kim Burse – Assistant production (1); Production (8)
 Michael Pollack – Production (2); Additional production (10)
 John Debney – Production (1)
 Nicholas Sarazen – Production (2)
 Jon Leone – Production (3)
 Danja – Production (4)
 Nyal – Production (5)
 Skylar Mones – Production (6)
 Johnny Goldstein – Co-production (6)
 Noel Zancanella – Co-production (6)
 Kevin Teasley – Production (8)
 Tommy Brown – Production (9)
 Steven Franks – Production (9)
 Dalton Diehl – Production (11)
 Arkadi – Production (12)
 German – Production (12)
 Jeff Shum – Co-production (11)
 Julio Copello – Additional production (8)
 Leroy Clampitt – Additional production (10)

Recording locations 

 9000 (Los Angeles, California)
 Art House (Miami, Florida)
 Barbara McLean Mixing (Los Angeles, California)
 Dream Asylum (Hallandale Beach, Florida)
 Grundman Mastering (Los Angeles, California)
 Hit23 (Miami, Florida)
 Hummingbird Hill (Spring Hill, Tennessee)
 Igloo (Burbank, California)
 La Casa De Juancho (Medellín, Colombia)
 M&S (Sherman Oaks, California)
 Mastering Place (New York City, New York)
 Mixstar (Virginia Beach, Virginia)
 Newman Scoring Stage (Los Angeles California)
 Patriot (Los Angeles, California)
 SafeHouseSound (Franklin, Tennessee)
 TLM (Los Angeles, California)
 Tone Room (New Boston, Michigan)

Charts

Release history

References

2020s film soundtrack albums
2022 soundtrack albums
Albums produced by Edgar Barrera
Comedy film soundtracks
Jennifer Lopez albums
Maluma albums
Romance film soundtracks
Sony Music Latin albums